Kyle Paul Macy (born April 9, 1957) is an American basketball commentator. He played college basketball at Purdue University and the University of Kentucky, and spent seven years in the NBA with the Phoenix Suns, Chicago Bulls and Indiana Pacers; he then spent three seasons in the Italian Lega Serie A. After his playing career, he has held various basketball-related positions, including coach, general manager, and broadcaster.

College career

Purdue

The 1975 Indiana "Mr. Basketball" Award winner from Peru High School, where he played for his father, Bob; chose to  attend Purdue University, coached by head coach, Fred Schaus. Macy averaged 13.8 points a game as a freshman, while leading the Boilermakers in free throws, shooting .859 percent from the line on the season. He started in 25 of 27 games, helping them to a 16–11 season record.

Kentucky

After playing his freshman year at Purdue, Macy transferred to the University of Kentucky in 1976. After sitting out the 1976–77 season as mandated by NCAA rules, he started playing at Kentucky in 1977. Macy had a very successful college career, as a three-time All-America and three-time All-SEC player. The 1978 team on which Macy was a starter won the 1978 NCAA National Championship. In his senior year of 1979–80, he became the first Kentucky player ever to be named consensus Southeastern Conference Player of the Year.

Professional career
Macy was selected with the 22nd pick of the 1979 NBA Draft by the Phoenix Suns, even though he had a year of college eligibility remaining. Macy played out his last year of college, and started playing for the Suns in 1980. Macy spent five years with the Suns, averaging 10.6 points and 4.0 assists per game. Macy spent one year each with the Chicago Bulls (1985–86) and the Indiana Pacers (1986–87) before retiring from the NBA. Then he played professionally in Italy for Dietor Bologna (1987–88) and Benetton Treviso (1988–90). Macy was also one of the original participants of the NBA All-Star Three Point Contest when it debuted in 1986.

Macy was an excellent free throw shooter throughout his career. During the 1981-82 NBA season he led the NBA in free throw percentage. He still holds the career free throw shooting percentage record at the University of Kentucky, and his .884 career percentage is second only to Steve Nash (.907) on the Phoenix Suns' career leaders list.

Later career
Macy was head coach of the Morehead State University Eagles of the Ohio Valley Conference for nine years. In 2003, Macy coached the Eagles to 20 wins, its most in 19 years, and a share of the OVC regular season championship. However, the 2004–05 season was less successful, as Morehead failed to qualify for the OVC tournament. Following that season, Macy coached a group of Sports Reach collegiate all-stars that toured China and finished with a perfect 7–0 record against several Chinese professional teams.  After a disastrous 4–23 season in 2005–06, Macy resigned as head coach on February 28, 2006.

Macy emphasized free throw shooting in his coaching, and the emphasis paid off, as his Morehead State teams were perennially among the Division I leaders in free throw shooting percentage.

Head coaching record

Later in 2006, Macy accepted the head coaching position on the Lexington Christian Academy Eagles Men's tennis team. In his first season they had their first winning season since 2003. In November 2007, Macy was named general manager of the East Kentucky Miners, an expansion team of the Continental Basketball Association, based in Pikeville, Kentucky. Later, he served as the color commentator for University of Kentucky telecasts. In October 2016, Macy joined the staff of head coach Brian Lane at Transylvania University.

References

External links
 Hall of Fame
 UK Career statistics

1957 births
Living people
All-American college men's basketball players
American expatriate basketball people in Italy
American men's basketball coaches
American men's basketball players
Basketball coaches from Indiana
Basketball players at the 1979 Pan American Games
Basketball players from Fort Wayne, Indiana
Chicago Bulls players
College basketball announcers in the United States
Indiana Pacers players
Kentucky Wildcats men's basketball players
Morehead State Eagles men's basketball coaches
Pallacanestro Treviso players
Pan American Games gold medalists for the United States
Pan American Games medalists in basketball
Parade High School All-Americans (boys' basketball)
People from Peru, Indiana
Phoenix Suns draft picks
Phoenix Suns players
Point guards
Purdue Boilermakers men's basketball players
Sportspeople from Fort Wayne, Indiana
Transylvania Pioneers men's basketball coaches
Virtus Bologna players
Medalists at the 1979 Pan American Games